Exmor is the name of a technology Sony implemented on some of their CMOS image sensors. It performs on-chip analog/digital signal conversion and two-step noise reduction in parallel on each column of the CMOS sensor.

Sensors from the Exmor family have become widely available in consumer technology.

History 
In October 2015, Sony Semiconductor Solutions was established as a wholly owned group company to reinforce the CMOS image sensor business and integrate the semiconductor-related business operations of Sony Group. Following the incorporation, all the Exmor sensors are designed and manufactured by the company.

On May 14, 2020, the Intelligent Vision Sensor was announced with an introduction that reads: "the first image sensor in the world to be equipped with AI processing functionality". The new sensor distinguishes itself from the previous Exmor RS sensors by an AI processor and a memory storing the AI models, included in a stacked logic layer for the real-time image analysis and instant extraction of metadata from a raw image. In the release, only model numbers were identified and it was not confirmed whether the sensor bears a different name.

On 29 June 2022, Xiaomi announced that it was using the IMX989, Sony's first 1-inch smartphone camera sensor, in the Xiaomi 12S Ultra. However, it later emerged that it was earlier used by Sharp Aquos R7 in May 2022, albeit slightly cropped in.

Versions

Exmor R 
Exmor R is a back-illuminated version of Sony's CMOS image sensor. Exmor R was announced by Sony on 11 June 2008 and was the world's first mass-produced implementation of the back-illuminated sensor technology. Sony claims that Exmor R is approximately twice as sensitive as a normal front illuminated sensor.

This active pixel sensor is found in several Sony mobile phones and cameras as well as Apple's iPhone 4s and 5. Originally, Exmor R was limited to smaller sensors for camcorders, compact cameras and mobile phones, but the Sony ILCE-7RM2 full-frame camera introduced on the 10 June 2015 features an Exmor R sensor as well.

Exmor RS 
Exmor RS is the world's first stacked CMOS image sensor and was announced by Sony on 20 August 2012. Subsequently, Sony announced the first 3-layer stacked CMOS sensor, which added DRAM cell array in the middle.

From the Exmor RS line, IMX582 or IMX586 sensors are widely implemented as 48 megapixel smartphone cameras (e.g. Samsung Galaxy S20), with the sensors having almost identical specifications, but for the IMX586 supporting faster frame rates at 4K. In early 2020, the IMX586 was followed by the IMX686, enlarging the format to 1/1.72" (increasing resolution to 64 megapixels), but keeping the same pixel size. Pixel binning is used to reduce the high sensor resolution to standard photographic resolutions such as 4K, overcoming some of the traditional limitations of Bayer filtering.

STARVIS 
STARVIS is a series of sensors with the Exmor RS family. It features high pixel sensitivity, making it suitable for low light applications. Industrial versions are finding applications in ambient-light surveillance systems. Commercial versions are finding applications in prosumer webcams with 4K HDR support, based on single exposure.

STARVIS 2 
From the second-generation STARVIS line (STARVIS 2), the IMX585 was announced on 29 June 2021, featuring a large image sensor format of f/1.2", making it suitable for low light photography. Sony designed the STARVIS 2 sensor family for AI face recognition in surveillance applications with difficult lighting conditions. The sensor's high dynamic range assists with this task. It became available in a Razer Inc. prosumer webcam in January 2023. Larger sensor form factors decrease depth of field, which is often desired for teleconferencing webcams. Sony claims near DSLR quality for some applications.

See also
Bionz – image processor
HAD CCD – Sony
Expeed – Nikon image/video processors
Toshiba CMOS
ISOCELL
OmniVision

References

Sony image sensors